Tabernaemontana palustris is a tropical flowering plant species in the family Apocynaceae. It grows in the Amazon Basin of northern South America. The species epithet palustris is Latin for "of the marsh" and indicates its common habitat.

In parts of the Peruvian Amazon, it is used medicinally to treat rheumatism, fever, and wounds; it may also be used as a purgative.

See also
 Tabernaemontana sananho

References

palustris
Flora of Colombia
Flora of Ecuador
Flora of Peru
Flora of Venezuela